The Delmenhorst–Hesepe railway is a single-track, non-electrified railway line from Delmenhorst to Hesepe, both in the German state of Lower Saxony.

The line was opened in four stages between 1888 and 1900. The first section from Vechta to Lohne was opened in 1888 as part of the Ahlhorn–Vechta railway. The section between Delmenhorst and Vechta opened on 1 May 1898. One year later on 1 November 1899 the section between Lohne and Neuenkirchen opened. This section was extended to Hesepe on 1 May 1900.

The services on the line have been operated by NordWestBahn since November 2000. The current contract continues until December 2026.

Usage
The line is used by the following service(s):

Local services Osnabrück - Bramsche - Vechta - Delmenhorst - Bremen

References

This article is based upon a translation of the German language version as at December 2015.

External links 

Railway lines opened in 1888
Railway lines in Lower Saxony